Suchdol is a market town in Kutná Hora District in the Central Bohemian Region of the Czech Republic. It has about 1,100 inhabitants.

Administrative parts
Villages of Dobřeň, Malenovice, Solopysky and Vysoká are administrative parts of Suchdol.

Etymology
The name is derived from suchý důl, i.e. "dry mine".

Geography
It lies in the Upper Sázava Hills. The Polepka Stream springs here and flows across the municipal territory.

History
The first written mention of Suchdol is from 1257. In 1666, it was bought by the Sporck family and merged with the Lysá estate. Before it became separate municipality in 1848, it was part of the Malešov estate.

Demographics

Sights

An architectonical landmark of Suchdol is the Suchdol Castle. The original Gothic fortress from the 14th century was rebuilt to the current form of a Renaissance castle in the 16th century. Baroque modifications were made in the mid-18th century. it is decorated with sgraffiti. In the second half of the 20th century, the building served as a school and library. Today it houses the municipal office.

The Church of Saint Margaret is located next to the castle. It was probably built around 1280. Baroque reconstruction took place in 1746–1747.

There are three other churches in the villages within the municipal territory: Church of the Visitation of the Virgin Mary in Vysoká, Church of Saint Wenceslaus in Dobřeň, and Church of Saint Bartholomew in Solopysky.

On Vysoká Hill is a ruin of the Chapel of Saint John the Baptist, now called "Belveder". It was founded by Franz Anton von Sporck and built in 1695–1697, but it was destroyed by fire after being struck by lightning in 1834.

Notable people
František Kmoch (1848–1912), composer and conductor; lived and worked here as a teacher between 1869 and 1873

References

External links

Market towns in the Czech Republic